Cristaerenea cognata is a species of beetle in the family Cerambycidae, and the only species in the genus Cristaerenea. It was described by Pascoe in 1859.

References 

Compsosomatini
Beetles described in 1859
Monotypic Cerambycidae genera